A serotonin releasing agent (SRA) is a type of drug that induces the release of serotonin into the neuronal synaptic cleft. A selective serotonin releasing agent (SSRA) is an SRA with less significant or no efficacy in producing neurotransmitter efflux at other types of monoamine neurons.

SSRAs have been used clinically as appetite suppressants, and they have also been proposed as novel antidepressants and anxiolytics with the potential for a faster onset of action and superior efficacy relative to the selective serotonin reuptake inhibitors (SSRIs).

A closely related type of drug is a serotonin reuptake inhibitor (SRI).

Examples and use of SRAs
Amphetamines like MDMA, MDEA, MDA, and MBDB, among other relatives (see MDxx), are recreational drugs termed entactogens. They act as serotonin-norepinephrine-dopamine releasing agents (SNDRAs) and also agonize serotonin receptors such as those in the 5-HT2 subfamily. Fenfluramine, chlorphentermine, and aminorex, which are also amphetamines and relatives, were formerly used as appetite suppressants but were discontinued due to concerns of cardiac valvulopathy. This side effect has been attributed to their additional action of potent agonism of the 5-HT2B receptor. The designer drug 4-methylaminorex, which is an SNDRA and 5-HT2B agonist, has been reported to cause this effect as well.

Many tryptamines, such as DMT, DET, DPT, DiPT, psilocin, and bufotenin, are SRAs as well as non-selective serotonin receptor agonists. These drugs are serotonergic psychedelics, which is a consequence of their ability to activate the 5-HT2A receptor. αET and αMT, also tryptamines, are SNDRAs and non-selective serotonin receptor agonists that were originally thought to be monoamine oxidase inhibitors and were formerly used as antidepressants. They have since been discontinued and are now encountered solely as recreational drugs.

Indeloxazine is an SRA and norepinephrine reuptake inhibitor that was formerly used as an antidepressant, nootropic, and neuroprotective.

List of SSRAs

Pharmaceutical drugs 
 Chlorphentermine (Apsedon, Desopimon, Lucofen)
 Cloforex (Oberex) (prodrug of chlorphentermine)
 Dexfenfluramine (Redux) (enantiomer of fenfluramine)
 Etolorex (prodrug of chlorphentermine; never marketed)
 Fenfluramine (Pondimin, Fen-Phen)
 Flucetorex (related to chlorphentermine; never marketed)
 Indeloxazine (Elen, Noin) (non-selective; discontinued)
 Levofenfluramine (enantiomer of fenfluramine)
 Carbamazepine (Equetro, Epitol, and many other variations)

Research chemicals 
 Amiflamine (FLA-336)
 Viqualine (PK-5078)
 2-Methyl-3,4-methylenedioxyamphetamine (2-Methyl-MDA)
 3-Methoxy-4-methylamphetamine (MMA)
 3-Methyl-4,5-methylenedioxyamphetamine (5-Methyl-MDA)
 3,4-Ethylenedioxy-N-methylamphetamine (EDMA)
 4-Methoxyamphetamine (PMA)
 4-Methoxy-N-ethylamphetamine (PMEA)
 4-Methoxy-N-methylamphetamine (PMMA)
 4-Methylthioamphetamine (4-MTA)
 5-(2-Aminopropyl)-2,3-dihydrobenzofuran (5-APDB)
 5-Indanyl-2-aminopropane (IAP)
 5-Methoxy-6-methylaminoindane (MMAI)
 5-Trifluoromethyl-2-aminoindane (TAI)
 5,6-Methylenedioxy-2-aminoindane (MDAI)
 5,6-Methylenedioxy-N-methyl-2-aminoindane (MDMAI)
 6-Chloro-2-aminotetralin (6-CAT)
 6-Tetralinyl-2-aminopropane (TAP)
 6,7-Methylenedioxy-2-aminotetralin (MDAT)
 6,7-Methylenedioxy-N-methyl-2-aminotetralin (MDMAT)
 N-Ethyl-5-trifluoromethyl-2-aminoindane (ETAI)
 6-(2-aminopropil)benzofurans (6-APB)
 5-(2-aminopropyl)benzofuran (5-APB)

See also
 Monoamine releasing agent

References

Further reading

External links

 
TAAR1 agonists
VMAT inhibitors